Kinsley Boys Football Club is a football club based in Kinsley near Wakefield in West Yorkshire, England.

History
The club was founded as Kinsley Village F.C. in 1962 as an under 18s side. The club then progressed as a senior side playing in various local leagues before winning promotion to the Central Midlands League in 2007–08, following the club finishing as champions of the Doncaster & District Senior League. After five seasons in the Central Midlands League, the last being in the North Division, the club transferred to the Sheffield and Hallamshire County Senior League, at the same level but with reduced travel. After one season in that league they were moved back to the Central Midlands League, remaining in this division until rejoining the Doncaster & District Senior League for the 2015–16 season.

The club participated in the FA Vase for the first time in 2011–12, reaching the first round proper in 2013–14.

Season-by-season record

Records
FA Vase
Second Qualifying Round 2011–12, 2012–13
First Round 2013–14

References

External links
Kinsley Boys – Official website

Football clubs in England
Football clubs in West Yorkshire
Association football clubs established in 1962
1962 establishments in England
Sheffield & Hallamshire County FA members
Doncaster & District Senior League
Central Midlands Football League
Sheffield & Hallamshire County Senior Football League